AutoTURN is a third-party CAD software released for the AutoCAD, MicroStation, BricsCAD, IntelliCAD (ZwCAD) platforms, developed and sold by Transoft Solutions Inc. AutoTURN software is made for use on computers that run Microsoft Windows operating system and is available as a 2D or 3D (Pro) version. A web based version of the software, AutoTURN Online is available on macOS and Windows operating systems through a browser integration in Vectorworks. Among a number of things, it analyses and simulates swept path vehicle maneuvers.

History

AutoTURN was originally developed for Transoft Solutions Inc. in 1991. AutoTURN was designed as the practical application of a University of Calgary civil engineering graduate studies thesis  by Milton Carrasco. The first version of AutoTURN was released for use on Autodesk’s AutoCAD Release 9. In the 25 years since the software was released, it has improved to reflect the needs of engineers and designers in the transportation sector. AutoTURN is used to analyze road and site design projects including intersections, roundabouts, bus terminals, loading bays, parking lots or any on/off-street assignments involving vehicle access checks, clearances, and swept path maneuvers.

In 1992, AutoTURN 2.0 was released and was the first released version of AutoTURN compatible with Bentley Systems MicroStation Unix. The libraries of vehicles available for swept path simulation and analysis was limited and vehicle simulations could only be carried out in a forward direction. AutoTURN 2.0 was compatible with AutoCAD Release 10 and then Unix version of MicroStation V 3.4.

AutoTURN 3.0 was released in 1993, less than 1 year after AutoTURN 2.0. The 3.0 release version of AutoTURN included many upgrades over its predecessor. This version of AutoTURN included larger vehicle libraries, and a supplement for use with aircraft (This supplement would become expanded into a separate software called AutoTURN Aircraft in 1995). Among other improvements, AutoTURN 3.0 enabled users to run simultaneous simulations of two vehicles in forward and reverse directions in a stop motion (frame by frame) animation. Simulations could only be done from pre-drawn paths.

In 2000 the release of AutoTURN 4.0 accounted for international users, it was the first version of AutoTURN available in multiple languages. Among other improvements, AutoTURN 4.0 included expanded international libraries of vehicles. To incorporate the many new capabilities it was necessary to make significant changes to the program’s visual interface and functionality. The change in interface included a new toolbar. Generate simulation tools were introduced so users didn’t first have to draw the vehicle path in order to generate a simulation. AutoTURN 4 introduced the concepts of Active Path and Active Simulation allowing for repetition of various functions without repeated re-selecting of objects. Like the previous release versions, AutoTURN 4.0 contained a supplement for aircraft.

AutoTURN 5.0’s release in 2004, among many other functions, introduced Heuristic algorithms for tracking, creation of simulations on spline elements, and improved layer management for simulations. The standard vehicle library file was changed to a searchable database of vehicles based on international or custom standards. Adding to those features AutoTURN 5.1 introduces the ability to set Steering Linkage ratios between the front and rear steering axle groups. Additionally, in the 5.1 version could continuously loop simulations.

The 2008 release of AutoTURN 6.0 added additional simulation functions. It builds on version 5.1’s abilities to loop simulations by adding the ability to export simulations to InVision (a separate software application) in order to create video clips. Plan view and chamfered vehicles can be used for simulations and or modified in this version.

In 2011, Transoft Solutions added 3D capabilities to the original AutoTURN product. The ability to view clearance issues on the horizontal and vertical planes provides engineers with a more complete picture of their project environments. Transoft engineers conducted several years of research to add the 3D capacity to the back-end code of the software.
In April 2014, AutoTURN 9.0 was released to the transportation engineering sector. A version upgrade was released in May 2015.

AutoTURN 10 was released in mid Q2 2016. In this major version release, AutoTURN Pro included the ability to evaluate multiple routes that avoid specified exclusion zones (e.g. buildings, curbs, etc.) and then generate movements with different vehicles on selected routes using a proprietary artificial intelligence algorithm.  The latest version 10.2, was released in January 2018 to the general public.

In March 2020, AutoTURN 11 was released. This version brought cycles (bicycles, cargo bikes, trikes and various adapted bikes) into the software for the first time allowing engineers and planners to design a more inclusive cycle infrastructure.

Release history

See also
 CAD
 Comparison of CAD Software
 List of CAx companies

References

External links
 

Computer-aided design software
Computer-aided design software for Windows
Computer-aided engineering software